This is a list of wadis in Oman arranged by drainage basin.

Gulf of Oman
Wadi Hatta
Wadi Abd ar Rahman
Wādī Banī ‘Umar al Gharbī
Wadi Suq
Wadi Jizzi
Wadi Sarami
Wadi al Hawasinah
Wadi al Abyad
Wadi Samail
Wadi Mayh
Wadi Mijlas
Wadi Dayqah
Wadi Hawir
Wadi al Arabiyin
Wadi Bimmah
Wadi Fins
Wadi Shab
Wadi Tiwi
Wadi Hilm
Wadi Rafsah

Arabian Sea
Wadi al Batha (Oman) (Batha River)
Wadi Bani Khalid
Wadi Andam
Wadi Matam
Wadi al Ithli
Wadi Mahram
Wadi Halfayn
Wadi Quiam
Wadi Tarban
Wadi Qilfah
Wadi Gharm
Wadi Haytam
Wadi Ghadun (Arabian Sea)
Wadi Watif
Wadi Aynayn (Aynina River)

Rub' al Khali
Wadi Dhank
Wadi Khuwaybah
Umm al Samim
Wadi al Ayn
Wadi Rafash
Wadi Aswad
Wadi Umayri
Wadi Haniyah
Wadi Ghul
Wadi Musallim
Wadi Majhul
Wadi Bin Khawtar
Wadi Arah
Wadi Qitbit
Wadi Jazal
Wadi Maharib
Wadi Umm al Hayt (Wadi Hayta)
Wadi Dawkah
Wadi Ghadun (Rub' al Khali)
Wadi Aydim
Wadi al Madi
Wadi Stum
Wadi Shihan
Nukhdat Fasad
Wadi Mitan

See also
 List of wadis of the United Arab Emirates
 List of wadis of Yemen

References

Oman
Rivers